William Thetford (April 25, 1923 – July 4, 1988) was an American psychologist, medical psychologist and professor. He is best known for his collaboration with Helen Schucman in typing the original manuscript and being on the editing team for A Course in Miracles (ACIM), a self-study curriculum in spiritual psychology. He died in 1988, aged 65, in Tiburon, California, after having made his involvement with the ACIM material and its study the most central focus of his life.

Early childhood 
Thetford was born on April 25, 1923, in Chicago, Illinois to John and Mabel Thetford as the youngest of three children.  At the time of his birth and early childhood, his parents were both regular members of the Christian Science church.  At the age of seven, the untimely death of his older sister caused his parents to disavow their affiliation with the Church of Christian Science.  Afterwards, for the next few years, Thetford sampled various other Protestant denominations.

At the age of nine he contracted a severe case of scarlet fever, which led to rheumatic fever and a debilitating heart condition.  These resulting health problems forced him to spend the next three years at home recuperating.  During his forced recuperation period he took advantage of the many free hours, using the time to satisfy his voracious appetite for reading.  Despite his absence from the classroom, he entered high school at the age of twelve.

University education 
Following graduation from high school, he was awarded a four-year scholarship to DePauw University in Indiana where he graduated with majors in psychology and pre-medicine in 1944.  During the course of his university studies, Thetford eventually settled on the idea of specializing in psychology, and in 1949 he received his PhD in this field from the University of Chicago.

After graduating from DePauw in January 1944 until the summer of 1945, Thetford had a job as an administrative officer at the University of Chicago working with the scientific team doing atomic research.  In his graduate studies he was fortunate to be one of the first students of the renowned psychologist, Carl Rogers.

Career and hiring of Helen Schucman 
For the five years following his graduation in 1949, Thetford worked as a research psychologist in both Chicago, and later in Washington, D.C. He was a research psychologist in the Institute for Psychosomatic & Psychiatric Research & Training at the Reese Hospital in Chicago from 1949-1951 and a senior psychologist for the United States government in Washington, DC from 1951-1954. In 1953 he was a consultant in Beirut, Lebanon at the Foreign Service Institute. He spent 1954 and 1955 as the director of clinical psychology at The Institute of Living in Hartford, Connecticut.  From 1955 to 1957 he was an assistant professor of psychology at Cornell University.

In 1958 he accepted an assistant professorship, which later developed into a full professorship, at the Columbia University College of Physicians and Surgeons.  During a portion of this same period he also served as the Director of Clinical Psychology at the Columbia-Presbyterian Hospital.  It was here that he would stay for the next 20 years, and it was here that he first met Helen Schucman, hiring her as a research psychologist and assistant.

A c.v. listing his positions, affiliations, grants, publications and papers is given as Appendix 2 in a biography Never Forget to Laugh by Carol Howe.

"Invitation" for A Course in Miracles 
The working relationship between Thetford and Schucman was apparently often somewhat strained, yet throughout these difficulties they would always maintain a certain level of professional courtesy and respect for one another.  The story is often retold that it was into this environment of inter-relational strain between Thetford and Schucman that the ACIM material was in a sense first “invited” into this world.  This “invitation” came in the form of an exclamation by Thetford one day, in the midst of one of their periodic difficulties, in which Thetford exclaimed, “There must be another way!”  This exclamation was followed by a certain speech he made to Schucman describing how he believed that it was time for them to try to refocus their energies on constructive and helpful agendas, rather than being forever hyper critical and hyper competitive with one another.  Expecting a typically condescending response from Schucman, the studied silence that followed his speech was then followed by a most surprising concurrence from Schucman, fully supporting his new proposal.  This speech was given in June 1965.

The next four months were filled with a number of unusually vivid dream sequences and even some unusual waking experiences for Schucman.  Amongst her vivid dream sequences, she began to become familiar with a certain internal character who spoke to her as Jesus in her dreams.  Little did she know that the voice of this dream character would soon come to dominate the rest of her life.  Many of her unusual experiences during these four months are recorded in the biographical work, Absence from Felicity, by Kenneth Wapnick.  Schucman appears to have confided her experiences with Thetford, who acted as a sort of a calming, encouraging and stabilizing influence for Schucman during this period.

A Course in Miracles transcription 
Finally in October of that year, the transcriptions of what is now known as A Course In Miracles first began.  According to both Thetford and Schucman, due to Schucman's intensely divided feelings about the work of the transcription, Schucman would at times require a great deal of reassurance from Thetford in order to complete the process that eventually resulted in the first typewritten copy of ACIM, which later became known as the Urtext.

According to Thetford, Schucman was sitting at home on the night of October 21, 1965, when she heard an internal "voice" say to her, "This is a course in miracles. Please take notes."

When she first heard this internal voice, she thought she recognized it as the same voice of the dream sequence character that in her recent dream sequences had represented the person of Jesus to her.  Schucman then wrote down about a page of notes before she realized that this request was going to be of much greater significance, and would require a far greater commitment in time than it had ever asked of her before.  In a panic, she phoned Thetford to ask for his advice.  Thetford encouraged Schucman to do what the voice asked, and to take the notes.  He offered to meet with her the next morning before work, to review her notes, to discuss them further with her, and then to determine what she should do with this "Voice".

On the following morning, after Thetford's review of the notes, he was so impressed with what she read to him that he encouraged Schucman to continue with the note taking. Schucman was initially taken aback by Thetford's reaction, but then apparently after giving herself enough time to recover from her initial jitters to honestly review the notes herself, she agreed.  Soon they recognized that the notes, which eventually became A Course in Miracles (referred to as The Course by ACIM students), was their answer, the "other way" that they had agreed to find together four months earlier.

Classifying this transcription process as one of Schucman's unusual waking experiences is an understatement at best.  During the process Schucman claimed to have the mental equivalent of a tape recorder in her thoughts, which she described as being able to turn on and off at will, at her convenience, so that she might be able to transcribe into shorthand notes, what she was internally hearing.  This voice identified itself as none other than the historical Jesus.

During the beginning of this process, one of Thetford's gentle complaints was, “In the beginning I spent most of my time while typing these notes with one hand on the typewriter and the other on Helen’s shoulder”.  After some months of experiencing an initial struggle in this process, eventually they both began to experience less subconscious resistance to the process, and the initial transcription began to move along more smoothly.

From 1965 through 1972 Thetford directly assisted Schucman with the transcription of the first three sections of the work, which was in fact the great bulk of the material.  Then in 1972, somewhat to both of their reliefs (yet on some levels to their dismay) it appeared that the writing was complete, which for the most part it was.

In 1972 Thetford and Schucman were introduced to Kenneth Wapnick through their mutual friend Father Groeshel. Wapnick was intrigued by the manuscript although he soon realized it needed considerable editing to render it into a publishable format.  Wapnick urged Helen to go over the manuscript once again with his assistance, which they did, bringing the final editing to a completion in the Spring of 1975.   Thetford, Wapnick and Schucman, the three principle transcriber-editors of ACIM were to remain friends for the rest of their lives, throughout the arduous process of seeing this manuscript through to first successful publication, and beyond to witness the initial spreading of its teachings.

After the completion of the bulk of the initial scribing/ transcribing process, for brief periods during 1973, 1975, and 1977 the short transcriptions of Psychotherapy, of Clarification of Terms, and of the Song of Prayer, which are the remainder of the standard material of ACIM, were transcribed in similar fashion.

From 1971 to 1978 Thetford, was involved in the CIA mind control Project MKULTRA Subproject 130: Personality Theory.

Move to California 
In 1978, Thetford resigned from his positions at both Columbia University and at Columbia Presbyterian Hospital. In 1980 he packed up his household and, at the apparent invitation of Judith Skutch Whitson, moved to Tiburon, California, where Whitson was by now employed full-time in the publication and distribution of ACIM.

Now in Tiburon at age 57, Thetford transitioned into a sort of semi-retirement, no longer accepting any demanding positions of heavy responsibility in either his professional life or in his involvement with the ever growing readership of ACIM.  In California, Thetford took on two part-time professional positions; one as a psychology consultant at Travis Air Force Base and the other as one of the directors of the ACIM-related Center for Attitudinal Healing in Tiburon, as offered to him by his friend and fellow student of ACIM, Gerald Jampolsky.

In California, Thetford spent the final eight years of his life regularly attending meetings of fellow ACIM students where ACIM principles would be discussed, but only rarely engaging in these discussions in any kind of an authoritative manner. Instead, during this final period of his life, he appears to have been primarily concerned with his own personal study of the ACIM material, and with enriching his own grasp of its message.

On July 4, 1988, at age 65, Thetford died of a massive heart attack.

References

Sources
 
 
 
 

1923 births
1988 deaths
A Course in Miracles
20th-century American psychologists
DePauw University alumni
University of Chicago alumni
20th-century American writers
20th-century American male writers